Sesame Street: Elmo's Playdate is a 2020 television special which was produced as an extension of Sesame Workshop's Caring for Each Other initiative in response to the COVID-19 pandemic in the United States. The special follows Elmo and other Sesame Street characters having a virtual playdate, along with a few celebrity guests. HBO and WarnerMedia's parent company, AT&T, was the program's sole sponsor, with United Health Care sponsoring the PBS Kids broadcast.

A second special, Elmo's Playdate: Scavenger Hunt, aired on August 6, 2020.

Synopsis
The television special follows Elmo (with the help of his father Louie) as he has a virtual playdate with Grover, Cookie Monster, Abby Cadabby, and some of his other friends over at Sesame Street via video conferencing, together with a few celebrity guests, figuring out new ways to play together considering the limitations of social distancing. The show also highlights the roles of emergency medical technicians, doctors, and other everyday heroes who are helping people throughout the COVID-19 public health crisis.

Cast

Sesame Street Muppet Performers
 Jennifer Barnhart as Zoe
 Tyler Bunch as Louie
 Leslie Carrara-Rudolph as Abby Cadabby
 Frankie Cordero as Rudy
 Stephanie D'Abruzzo as Prairie Dawn
 Ryan Dillon as Elmo
 Eric Jacobson as Bert and Grover
 Peter Linz as Ernie
 Carmen Osbahr as Rosita
 Martin P. Robinson as Telly Monster
 David Rudman as Cookie Monster
 Matt Vogel as Big Bird and Count von Count

Humans
 Alan Muraoka as Alan
 Suki Lopez as Nina

Special guest stars
 Tracee Ellis Ross as Herself
 Lin-Manuel Miranda as Himself
 Taye Diggs as Himself (archived performance of "Let's Go Driving" with Elmo)
 Anne Hathaway as Herself

Broadcast 
The special was broadcast at 7pm EDT on HBO and PBS Kids and was simulcast on WarnerMedia-owned networks: TBS, TNT, truTV, HBO Latino, Cartoon Network, and Boomerang. It also re-aired on select PBS stations across the United States.

In Canada, the special was simulcast on April 15 at 4pm on Corus Entertainment networks Global, Teletoon, YTV, Cartoon Network, and Treehouse TV. on Singapore, the special was broadcast on Mediacorp's Channel 5 through its children's programming block Okto. It aired on April 19, following the network's telecast of One World: Together at Home.

In the United Kingdom (where Elmo and Cookie Monster appeared as characters in spin-off shows, Sesame Tree and The Furchester Hotel), the special was broadcast on CBeebies on May 8, and repeated on BBC One on May 30 at 1.15pm, marking the first time Sesame Street has been broadcast on the BBC's main domestic television network.

In Japan, the special was broadcast on NHK Educational TV on May 17.

In Australia, the special was broadcast on ABC Kids on May 30.

References

External links 
 

2020 television specials
American television specials
Sesame Street features
Television shows about the COVID-19 pandemic